The discography of Johnny Gill, an American R&B singer, consists of eight solo studio albums, thirty-seven singles, and three official compilation albums. In addition to solo albums, he has recorded one duet album with Stacy Lattisaw, as well as three albums as a member of New Edition and two albums as a member of supergroup LSG. Gill is also a member of supergroup Heads of State, but the group has yet to release an album.

Albums

Studio albums

Collaboration album

Compilation albums

Singles

As featured artist

Music videos

Notes

References

Discographies of American artists
Rhythm and blues discographies
Soul music discographies